Elachista nielswolffi is a moth of the family Elachistidae. It is found in Fennoscandia and northern Russia.

The larvae feed on Deschampsia flexuosa and possibly on Nardus stricta. They mine the leaves of their host plant. They are pale dull dirty white.

References

nielswolffi
Moths described in 1976
Moths of Europe